Gjirokastër National Folklore Festival is an artistic festival taking place every five years at Gjirokastër Castle in Gjirokastër, southern Albania. The festival was first held in 1968 and is regarded as the most important event in Albanian culture. The festival showcases Albanian traditional music, dress and dance from Albania, the diaspora, and Albanian inhabited lands throughout the Balkans and Southern Italy. The Gjirokastër Festival followed the tradition of the Folklore Festivals started in Tirana in 1949.

History 

The Gjirokastër National Folklore Festival was preceded by the National Festival of Song, Music and Dance held in Tiranë, capital of Albania in 1949 and subsequently on November 25–27, 1959. Ten years later, on October 8–16, 1968, the first National Folklore Festival was held in Gjirokastër to celebrate the birthday of Enver Hoxha, the communist leader of Albania and native of the city. The festival was reheld every five years in 1973, 1978, 1983, and 1988. In 1995 the festival was held in the citadel of Berat, while since September 2000 it has been  held again in Gjirokastër.

The 9th season was held in September 2009. The winners of the Festival was the Shkodër County as overall best performance, whereas the best individual performances was deemed those of bards Sherif Dervishi and Myfterin Uka.

The festival's 10th season took place from May 10–16, 2015. Due to the COVID-19 pandemic, the festival's 11th season was rescheduled for May 1 to 8, 2021.

Other festivals
Traditional Albanian clothing, dances, and folklore are showcased in several other festivals including Sofra Dardane every June in Bajram Curri, Oda Dibrane in Peshkopi, Logu i Bjeshkeve every August in Kelmend, Cham Dance Festival in Saranda and Konispol, and other festivals in various Albanian cities.

Sources

External links
Official Website of Ministry of Culture of Albania

Albanian folklore
Folk festivals in Albania
Music festivals established in 1968
Gjirokastër
Tourist attractions in Gjirokastër County
Autumn events in Albania